Vere Fane Benett-Stanford (1840–1894) was an English politician.

Early life
Vere Fane Benett-Stanford was born Vere Fane in 1840. His father was Reverend Arthur Fane of the Fane family and his mother, Anna Maria Benett, the daughter of John Benett (1773–1852). He grew up at the family country house of Pythouse near Tisbury, Wiltshire. He took his maternal grandfather's name, becoming known as Vere Fane Benett.

Career
He was a Major and later Colonel in the British Army.

He served as Conservative Member of Parliament for Shaftesbury from 1873 to 1880.

Personal life
In October 1867, he married Elen Stanford, whose late father, William Stanford, had served as High Sheriff of Sussex in 1808. He took his wife's name, becoming known as Vere Fane Benett-Stanford. They resided at Preston Manor in Preston Village, Brighton. He also lived at Adelaide Mansions in nearby Hove.

Death
He died in May 1894, at Quinta Vigia, Funchal. After his death, his wife Elen Stanford remarried in 1897.

References

1840 births
1894 deaths
People from Tisbury, Wiltshire
People from Hove
Conservative Party (UK) MPs for English constituencies
UK MPs 1868–1874
UK MPs 1874–1880